Béla Köpeczi (16 September 1921 – 17 January 2010) was a Hungarian cultural historian and politician, who served as minister of education between 1982 and 1988. He was the secretary-general of the Hungarian Academy of Sciences from 1972 to 1975.

References
 MTA curriculum vitae

1921 births
2010 deaths
Hungarian communists
Education ministers of Hungary